Herman Doomer or Hermann Dommers (1595 – 14 March 1650) was a Dutch Golden Age furniture and frame-maker who is best known today for his portrait by Rembrandt.

Life

He was born in Anrath, near Venlo, and married Baertje Martens from Naarden in 1618. He ran a successful business in ebony-veneer furniture and frames in the Kalverstraat, Gasthuismolensteeg and Hartenstraat. By 1625 Doomer already played a prominent role within the group of Amsterdam ebony workers. At times he collaborated with Pieter Quast and Johannes Lutma. From 1641 he used colored baleen.

Doomer was buried at Nieuwezijds Kapel as his widow (1596-1678). 

His son Lambert Doomer, a landscape painter, assisted the mother in the business. He inherited both portraits and made copies for his siblings.

Pendant portrait

Furniture

References

External links
 https://www.rijksmuseum.nl/en/rijksstudio/artists/herman-doomer
 https://www.rijksmuseum.nl/en/collection/BK-1978-188
 https://www.phoogendijk.com/Furniture/A-rare-cupboard-attributed-to-Herman-Doomer
 https://www.codart.nl/acquisitions/rijksmuseum-acquires-monumental-ebony-cabinet-by-herman-doomer/

1595 births
1650 deaths
People from Viersen (district)
Woodworkers